Katherine Wright may refer to:

 Katherine Fairfax Wright, American filmmaker and documentarian
 Katherine Wright (field hockey) (born 1989), Canadian field hockey player

See also
 Katie Wright (Kathryn Wright, born 1981), American actress
 Katharine Wright (1874–1929), sister of aviation pioneers Wilbur and Orville Wright